The Soldiers of Pancho Villa is a 1959 Mexican epic historical drama film co-written, produced, and directed by Ismael Rodríguez, inspired by the popular Mexican Revolution corrido "La Cucaracha". It stars María Félix and Dolores del Río in the lead roles, and features Emilio Fernández, Antonio Aguilar, Flor Silvestre, and Pedro Armendáriz in supporting roles.

The film was nominated for a Golden Palm award at the 1959 Cannes Film Festival. It was named the ninety-sixth best film of Mexican cinema by Somos magazine. Filming took place in Zacatecas and in Sierra de Órganos National Park in the town of Sombrerete, México

Plot
When the Mexican Revolution was exploding, there was a woman who made history, her name was "La Cucaracha" (María Félix). Her great passion was the Revolution, but her downfall was a man: Colonel Antonio Zeta (Emilio Fernández), who has eyes for another woman, Isabel, the widow (Dolores del Río). The rivalry between both women explodes.

Cast
 María Félix as Refugio "La Cucaracha"
 Dolores del Río as Isabel
 Emilio Fernández as Colonel Antonio Zeta
 Antonio Aguilar as Captain Ventura
 Flor Silvestre as Lola
 Ignacio López Tarso as Trinidad
 Cuco Sánchez as Soldier
 Irma Torres as Soldadera
 Miguel Manzano as Gabriel Fuentes
 Lupe Carriles as "Trompeta"
 Humberto Almazán as Soldier
 Alicia del Lago as Pregnant soldadera
 Emma Roldán as Midwife
 Tito Novaro as Jacobo Méndez
 Manuel Trejo Morales as Mayor
 Antonio Haro Oliva as Revolutionary priest
 David Reynoso as Colonel Ricardo Zúñiga
 Amado Zumaya as Soldier
 Luis Mario Jarero as Don Lupe
 Manuel Vergara as Soldier
 Guillermo Hernández as Soldier
 Magdaleno Barba
 Armando Gutiérrez as Priest
 José Carlos Méndez as Pinguico
 Pedro Armendáriz as Colonel Valentín Razo
 Los Dorados as Performers at cantina
 Dueto América as Singing revolutionary duet

Release
La Cucaracha premiered at the Robles and Ariel theaters in Mexico City on November 12, 1959  for five weeks. It premiered in the United States at New York City's Tivoli Theatre on November 1, 1961.

Critical reception
Howard Thompson of The New York Times gave La Cucaracha a positive review by writing: "Although the film never rises in stature above its melodramatic plane and romantic embellishments, it is well acted, crisply directed by producer Ismael Rodríguez and graphically photographed by Gabriel Figueroa... Both Señorita Félix, as the amoral spitfire, and Señorita Del Río, as her aristocratic adversary, are persuasively passionate. Señor Fernández, as their manly quarry, is excellent. Even minus real depth, there is much to be said for a melodramatic eye-filler as tough and tangy as this one. Neighbors below, let's have more."

Accolades

References

External links

1959 films
1959 romantic drama films
María Félix
Films directed by Ismael Rodríguez
Mexican Revolution films
Mexican romantic drama films
1950s Mexican films